Brigadier General Samuel Lyman Atwood Marshall, also known as SLAM, (July 18, 1900 – December 17, 1977) was a military journalist and historian. He served with the American Expeditionary Forces in World War I, before becoming a journalist, specialising in military affairs.

In 1940, he published Blitzkrieg: Armies on Wheels, an analysis of the tactics used by the Wehrmacht, and re-entered the U.S. Army as its chief combat historian during World War II and the Korean War. He officially retired in 1960 but acted as an unofficial advisor and historian during the Vietnam War. In total, Marshall wrote over 30 books, including Pork Chop Hill: The American Fighting Man in Action, later made into a film of the same name, as well as The Vietnam Primer, co-authored by Colonel David H. Hackworth.

His most famous publication is Men Against Fire: The Problem of Battle Command, which claimed that fewer than 25% of men in combat actually fired their weapons at the enemy. While the data used to support this has been challenged, his conclusion that a significant number of soldiers do not fire their weapons in combat has been verified by multiple studies performed by other armies, going back to the 18th century and continuing into the 20th.

Why this is so remains contested; Marshall argued that even with their own lives at risk, the resistance of the average individual “...toward killing a fellow man" was such that "he will not...take life if it is possible to turn away from that responsibility and at the vital point, he becomes a conscientious objector". Others argue so-called 'low fire' is a function of training and discipline, and is a positive attribute. These debates continue since understanding is crucial to overcoming them through training, as well as dealing with actual or potential combat-stress disorder.

Personal biography
Marshall was born in Catskill, New York on July 18, 1900, the son of Caleb C. and Alice Medora (Beeman) Marshall. He was raised in Colorado and California, where he briefly worked as a child actor for Essanay Studios; his family relocated to El Paso, Texas where he attended high school.

He was married three times, first to Ruth Elstner, with whom he had a son before divorcing; his second wife, Edith Ives Westervelt, died in 1953 and he had three daughters with his third wife, Catherine Finnerty. Marshall died in El Paso on December 17, 1977, and was buried at Fort Bliss National Cemetery, Section A, Grave 124. The University of Texas at El Paso library has a special collection built around his books and manuscripts.

Career

Service in WWI and career pre-1942 
Marshall enlisted in the US Army on November 28, 1917, joining the 315th Engineer Battalion, part of the 90th Infantry Division. Based initially in Camp Travis, near San Antonio, Texas, his division transferred to France with the American Expeditionary Forces in June 1918 and Marshall was promoted to sergeant. The 315th took part in the Battle of Saint-Mihiel and Meuse-Argonne Offensive. A 1921 record of the 315th Engineers from formation to the end of 1918 shows that during six weeks of active service, Marshall's company lost nine dead and fifteen wounded out of 165 men.

Shortly after the Armistice, Marshall was selected to take the entrance examinations for the United States Military Academy, part of an initiative to promote exceptional soldiers from the ranks. He subsequently attended Officer Candidate School, was commissioned in early 1919, and remained in France to assist with post-war demobilization.

After his discharge, he remained in the United States Army Reserve, and attended the Texas College of Mines, now the University of Texas at El Paso. In the early 1920s, he became a newspaper reporter and editor, first with the El Paso Herald, and later The Detroit News.  As a reporter, Marshall gained a national reputation for his coverage of Latin American and European military affairs, including the Spanish Civil War. In 1940, he published Blitzkrieg: Armies on Wheels, an analysis of the tactics developed by the Wehrmacht prior to World War II, and used during its invasion of Poland and Czechoslovakia.

World War II combat historian

Following American entry into World War II in December 1941, the United States Army created the "Center of Military History", whose role was to "gather historically significant data and materials" for the benefit of future historians, an organisation that still exists. This initially consisted of 27 officers, including Marshall, although he viewed himself as a military analyst, rather than a historian. His first combat assignment was the Battle of Makin in November 1943, during which he used the oral history technique known as After action review, a process still employed by modern armies. He would gather surviving members of a front line unit and debrief them as a group on their combat experiences of a day or two before.

Marshall later claimed he did so to resolve a dispute over who had been responsible for holding off a number of Japanese counter-attacks. By interviewing individual participants, each with a slightly different perspective, he created an overall picture of the action considerably more detailed and accurate than done previously. Using standard questions, he was able to produce large numbers of similar reports, a process helped by his journalistic experience, which were used by the Army to identify tactical lessons. For example, Marshall found that for various reasons tanks called in to support infantry often withdrew even when their help was still required; to overcome this problem, they were made subordinate to the local infantry commander for the duration of the action.

His techniques quickly became standard and in 1944 Marshall was transferred to Europe where he ended the war as chief combat historian. In 1947, he used these interviews as the basis for his best known work Men Against Fire, whose most notable conclusion was that 75% of individual riflemen engaged in combat never fired at an exposed enemy for the purpose of killing, even when directly threatened. Marshall argued civilian norms against taking life were so strong many conscripts could not bring themselves to kill, even at the risk of their own lives, and suggested changes in training that would increase the percentage willing to engage the enemy with direct fire. Many were incorporated by the US military; Marshall reported far more men fired weapons during the Vietnam War.

Less well known, but perhaps more significant, was Marshall's effort to assemble German officers after the war to write histories and analyses of battles in all theatres of the European war. At the height of the project, over 200 German officers participated, including Heinz Guderian and Franz Halder. Hundreds of monographs were written based on this data project, of which three are available in commercial print.

Later military service
Marshall was recalled in late 1950 for three months' duty as a Historian/Operations Analyst for the Eighth Army during the Korean War.  He collected numerous Korean combat interviews with Americans in Korea into a treatise analyzing U.S. infantry and weapons effectiveness, Commentary on Infantry and Weapons in Korea 1950–51.  The Army classified his findings as restricted information, later incorporating them into a plan to improve combat training, weapons, equipment, and tactics.

Following his retirement from the Army Reserve in 1960, with the rank of brigadier general, Marshall continued to serve as an unofficial adviser to the Army. As a private citizen, he spent late 1966 and early 1967 in Vietnam on an Army-sponsored tour for the official purpose of teaching his after-action interview techniques to field commanders, in order to improve data collection for both the chain of command and the future official history of the Vietnam War. The Army Chief of Military History's representative on the tour, Colonel David H. Hackworth, collected his own observations from the trip and published them as The Vietnam Primer, with Marshall credited as co-author.

Controversies

Research methodology

Although his conclusions were widely accepted during his lifetime, after his death in 1977 Marshall's approach was questioned by scholars such as Roger Spiller and Kelly Jordan, who claimed the interviews used to support his ratio-of-fire theory either did not exist or were fabricated. However, some of his original field survey notes which are held by the US Army Military History Institute were reviewed by Fred Williams in 1990. When comparing Marshall's claims from 31 pages of his books to what was written in his original notes, Williams found that while he "occasionally increased the numbers of men or the distances involved by twenty to fifty percent", in general his books followed these "exactly". The official US historian of the 1944 Battle of the Bulge also wrote that Marshall's oral interviews with participants in the battle aligned with testimony from other sources.

His former collaborator Hackworth described Marshall as a "voyeur warrior", for whom "the truth never got in the way of a good story", although Hackworth's own veracity and reliability as a witness has been questioned. Similar criticisms were made by Harold Leinbaugh, an ex-FBI employee and WWII infantry veteran who considered his conclusions a slur on the fighting ability of American soldiers and labelled them "absurd, ridiculous and totally nonsensical". Doubts as to whether Marshall's conclusions derive from a reliable and “systematic collection of data" remain even among those who support his conclusions,  while Canadian military historian Robert Engen claims Marshall "wilfully disregarded important evidence" that did not align with his preconceptions.

Despite this, Grossman argues "Marshall's fundamental conclusion that man is not, by nature, a killer" is confirmed by data from other armies and different historical periods. These include studies conducted by the 19th century French military theorist Ardant du Picq, Paddy Griffith's 1989 book Battle Tactics of the American Civil War, which analyses the "extraordinarily low killing rate" among American Civil War regiments, and Acts of War; The Behaviour of Men in Battle by British military historian Richard Holmes. The claim was also supported by FBI studies into non-firing rates by law enforcement officers in the 1950s and 1960s.

Surveys of after action reports conducted during WWII in the British and Soviet armies showed low firing rates were common in both, to the extent Russian officers suggested inspecting rifles after combat, and court-martialling those found with clean barrels. Engen argues contemporary Canadian evidence does not support Marshall's claims, although Grossman suggests this may be the result of training techniques that pioneered realistic marksmanship training.

WWI service

Leinbaugh, who viewed Marshall's claims as "maligning" American infantrymen and admitted that he took them personally,  also queried details of his World War I service. He argued significant parts of Marshall's service record were not substantiated by independent evidence, including his claim to have been the youngest commissioned officer in the US Army or to have commanded troops in combat. Grossman challenged the suggestion that these amounted to fabrications.

In response, John Douglas Marshall, who was disowned by his grandfather after receiving an honorable discharge from the Army as a conscientious objector during the Vietnam War, wrote a memoir about his grandfather ("Reconciliation Road") in 1993. He analyzed his grandfather's WWI service, using official army records and personal letters written during the Meuse-Argonne offensive. He also discovered a scrapbook compiled by his grandfather and dedicated to a colleague in the 315th killed in action on November 8, 1918. In the preface, the elder Marshall wrote of being present when his friend was shot near Bantheville, although records show he was in fact hit by artillery fire, while Marshall himself was absent taking the West Point entrance exams that day. John Marshall ultimately concluded the vast majority of his grandfather's wartime experiences were independently verified by his service record and any exaggerations were minor and did not undermine the validity of his later work.

Legacy

One of Marshall's suggestions for improving rates of fire was to use realistic man-shaped targets rather than bullseyes, a practice which is now standard among militaries and law enforcement agencies. Much of the ongoing discussion regarding his research centres on reasons for "non-firing" and is of continuing interest to militaries in order to determine how to optimise training and manage issues like post traumatic stress disorder. Engen suggests Marshall's work led combat psychologists to identify the act of killing as a major factor in PTSD, not just an individual's personal experience under fire or the deaths of their comrades. This factor has been identified as the most significant driver of PTSD among remote drone operators, who may never directly come under fire.

Marshall's contention low firing rates were a function of social conditioning against killing has been partially supported by historians like Omer Bartov, who suggests weakening these norms through deliberate brutalisation was one reason for the Wehrmacht's better combat performance in WWII compared to other armies. Bartov argues achieving this came from the long-standing German military doctrine of wide scale reprisals against civilians or those accused of supporting partisan operations and Nazi propaganda describing opponents as "sub-human".

However, he identified other elements in overcoming this reluctance, the strongest being loyalty to the group; paradoxically, the enormous casualties suffered by the Wehrmacht led to an increased focus on sections of 4–6 'comrades', which were far better at maintaining morale and fighting ability. It has been argued the incorporation of this small group doctrine into infantry training was the single most important factor for improving the ratio of fire metric in Korea and later Vietnam.

In his assessment of Marshall's findings, military historian John Keegan wrote: 

Meanwhile, military historian Roger Engen concluded the following:

Medals and decorations

Bibliography
 Blitzkrieg (1940)
 Armies on Wheels (1941) 
 Bastogne: The Story of the First Eight Days... (1946)
 Men Against Fire: The Problem of Battle Command (1947)
 The Soldier's Load and The Mobility of a Nation (1950)
 The River and the Gauntlet (1951)
 Pork Chop Hill: The American Fighting Man in Action, Korea, Spring, 1953  (1956)
 Sinai Victory: Command Decisions in History's Shortest War, Israel's Hundred-Hour Conquest of Egypt East of Suez, Autumn, 1956  (1958)
 Night Drop: The American Airborne Invasion of Normandy  (1962)
 Battle at Best (1963)
 World War I (1964)
 Battles of the Monsoon (1965)
 The Vietnam Primer (1967) (with David H. Hackworth)
 Swift Sword: The Historical Record of Israel's Victory, June 1967 (1967)
 Ambush (1968) (The battle of Dau Tieng)
 Bird; the Christmastide battle (1968)
 The fields of bamboo : Dong Tre, Trung Luong, and Hoa Hoi, three battles just beyond the South China Sea (1971)
 Crimsoned Prairie (1972)
 Bringing Up the Rear:  A Memoir (1979) (posthumous autobiography)

Notes

References

Sources

External links

 
 
 S. L. A. Marshall Photograph Collection at US Army Heritage and Education Center

1900 births
1977 deaths
20th-century American historians
United States Army generals
United States Army personnel of World War I
United States Army personnel of World War II
United States Army personnel of the Korean War
American military historians
American male non-fiction writers
Historians of World War I
Historians of World War II
Historians of the Korean War
Historians of the Vietnam War
Writers from New York (state)
Recipients of the Legion of Merit
Recipients of the Croix de Guerre 1939–1945 (France)
Burials in Texas
People from Catskill, New York
Historians from New York (state)